Sloan Hendrix School District is a public school district based in Imboden, Arkansas. The district serves more than 700 students in prekindergarten through grade 12 while employing more than 110 educators and staff at its three schools and district offices.

The school district encompasses  of land, in Lawrence County and Randolph County serving all or portions of Imboden, Ravenden, Black Rock, and Ravenden Springs.

History 
On July 1, 2010, the Twin Rivers School District was dissolved. A portion of the district was given to the Sloan-Hendrix district.

Schools 
 Sloan–Hendrix Elementary School, serving prekindergarten through grade 4.
 Sloan–Hendrix Middle School, serving grades 5 through 7.
 Sloan–Hendrix High School, serving grades 8 through 12.

References

Further reading
Maps of the predecessor districts:
  (Download)
  (Download)

External links

 

Education in Lawrence County, Arkansas
Education in Randolph County, Arkansas
School districts in Arkansas